Association Sportive des Cheminots or simply AS Cheminots is a Congolese football club based in Pointe-Noire, Republic of the Congo. They play in the Congo Premier League.

Honours
Congo Premier League: 1
 1995.

Coupe du Congo: 2
 1982, 1984.

Super Coupe du Congo: 0

External links
Team profile - Soccerway.com

Football clubs in the Republic of the Congo
Pointe-Noire